Dino Babies is a 1994–1996 children's animated television series about six baby dinosaurs who share stories and adventures.

Production and airings
Originally produced between 1991 and 1994, Dino Babies was first aired on the BBC in the United Kingdom from 1994 to 1996. It comprised 26 20-minute double episodes. Dino Babies was broadcast on many international stations, but the show had little success in the United States. In 1996, however, the series was syndicated across the country by The Program Exchange; it also aired for a short time on what was then the Fox Family Channel in 1999. The show had somewhat better success in Canada, where it aired on YTV from 1994 to 1999. In Asia, Dino Babies was aired in English on Dubai 33 and the pan-regional STAR Plus while the series was aired in Hebrew on Arutz HaYeladim, in Hindi on Zee TV and in Chinese on STAR Chinese Channel.

Overview
In every episode, the Dino Babies put their own imaginative spin on a classic tale, from "Dak and the Beanstalk" to "The Abominable Snowbaby". As fun as these flights of fancy were, they always had something important to say about the dinosaurs themselves and the world around them. By acting out classic tales, the dinosaurs learned valuable moral lessons.

Characters
Truman (voiced by Kathleen Barr) – The group's unofficial leader and storyteller, a bespectacled blue brainiac with a tuft of orange hair.
LaBrea (voiced by Andrea Libman) – Marshall's best friend. The only female Dino Baby. A headstrong purple dinosaur with blonde hair, often challenged Truman's authority, but she was a good friend at heart, though occasionally gets angry and short-tempered. Probably best known for saying two phrases, the more famous "I told you so" used whenever something went wrong, and the less frequent "Would you evolve?" used whenever someone suggested something very silly.
Stanley (voiced by Matt Hill) – A green dinosaur with red spots. He is a bragger who often runs into trouble. He also likes collecting rocks.
Franklin (voiced by Sarah Strange) – A timid, hesitant purple dinosaur. He occasionally shows signs of bravery.
Marshall (voiced by Samuel Vincent) – Franklin's little brother. A brown, diaper-wearing daredevil dinosaur. He sometimes gets upset due to being the smallest of the group, also known by the nickname "Marshy". He also likes using the phrase; "Oakie Dokie".
Dak (voiced by Scott McNeil) – A blue, attention-starved pterosaur. While he often plays tricks on the group, they remain friends all the same. He usually calls the rest of the group "Groundlings".

Episodes

Season 1 (1994)

In Season 1, each episode followed the same pattern: the first segment featured a story, while the second segment did not, with the exceptions being episodes four and five, where both segments featured a story, and episodes six, seven and nine, where the segments without a story came first, and the segments with a story came second.

All transmission data is from the BBC Genome project.

This season was repeated on Fridays from 7 April through to 12 May 1995, except for Good Friday 14 April. It then began Monday and Friday repeats from Monday, 15 to Friday, 26 May 1995. It then switched to a reversal of the previous format from Friday 2 to Monday, 5 June 1995, before finishing its repeat run on two consecutive Fridays, 9 and 16 June 1995. All repeat transmissions were on BBC1 at 3:45 pm.

Season 2 (1996)

In Season 2, each episode followed the same pattern; both segments featured a story, with the exceptions of episodes sixteen and seventeen, where the first segments featured a story, and the second segments did not. During the original run of the season, the twenty-second episode was aired two weeks after the twenty-first instead of one week, due to coverage of the Grand National on 28 March 1996.

All transmission data is from the BBC Genome project.

References

External links

Planète Jeunesse – Dino Juniors (French)

1994 British television series debuts
1994 American television series debuts
1996 American television series debuts
1994 Canadian television series debuts
1996 Canadian television series endings
1996 British television series endings
1990s American animated television series
1990s British animated television series
1990s Canadian animated television series
Animated television series about children
Animated television series about dinosaurs
British children's animated comedy television series
British children's animated fantasy television series
Irish children's animated comedy television series
Irish children's animated fantasy television series
BBC children's television shows
English-language television shows
YTV (Canadian TV channel) original programming